The 1963 South American Championship was held in Bolivia between 10 and 31 March 1963. It was won by Bolivia with Paraguay second. This is, so far, Bolivia's only Copa America title.

Squads

For a complete list of participating squads see: 1963 South American Championship squads

Venues

Final round

 was not invited due to the Lauca River conflict with Bolivia.

 withdrew due to the designation of La Paz as a tournament site.

 did not enter.

Result

Goal scorers
With six goals, Carlos Alberto Raffo of Ecuador is the top scorer in the tournament. In total, 91 goals were scored by 40 different players, with none of them credited as own goal.

6 goals
  Carlos Alberto Raffo
5 goals
  Mario Rodríguez
  Máximo Alcócer
  Flávio Minuano
4 goals
  Raúl Savoy
  Wilfredo Camacho
  Eladio Zárate
  Alberto Gallardo
3 goals

  Roberto Héctor Zárate
  Ausberto García
  Fortunato Castillo
  Oswaldo Taurisano
  Enrique Raymondi
  Cecilio Martinez
  César Cabrera

2 goals

  Víctor Ugarte
  Marco Antônio
  Alonso Botero
  Carlos Campillo
  Delio Gamboa
  Herman Aceros
  Jorge Bolaños
  Pedro Pablo León

1 goal

  Ernesto Humberto Juárez
  Jorge Hugo Fernández
  Juan Carlos Lallana
  Ramiro Blacut
  Renán López
  Almir Da Silva
  Fernando Consul
  Francisco González
  Héctor González
  Carlos Pineda
  Leonardo Palacios
  Néstor Azón
  Félix Arambulo
  Oppe Quiñónez
  Pelayo Ayala
  Enrique Tenemás
  Nemesio Mosquera

External links
 South American Championship 1963 at RSSSF

 
1963
South American Championship, 1963
1963
South American Championship, 1963
March 1963 sports events in South America
Sport in Cochabamba
Sports competitions in La Paz
20th century in La Paz